Filippo Berra (born 6 February 1995) is an Italian professional footballer who plays as a defender for  club Südtirol

Club career
He made his professional debut in the Lega Pro for Carrarese on 30 August 2014 in a game against Tuttocuoio.

On 26 July 2019, he joined Bari on a four-year contract. On 29 September 2020, he joined Pordenone on loan.

On 30 July 2021, Berra joined to Pisa.

On 28 July 2022, Berra moved to Südtirol on a two-year contract.

References

External links
 

1995 births
Living people
Sportspeople from Udine
Italian footballers
Association football defenders
Serie B players
Serie C players
Udinese Calcio players
Carrarese Calcio players
F.C. Pro Vercelli 1892 players
S.S.C. Bari players
Pordenone Calcio players
Pisa S.C. players
F.C. Südtirol players
Italy youth international footballers
Footballers from Friuli Venezia Giulia